Hannah Starkey (born 1971) is a British photographer who specializes in staged settings of women in city environments, based in London. In 2019 she was awarded an Honorary Fellowship of the Royal Photographic Society.

Hannah Starkey: In Real Life is showing at The Hepworth Wakefield until 30 April 2023.

Biography
Born in Belfast, Starkey studied photography and film at Napier University, Edinburgh (1992–1995) and photography at the Royal College of Art, London (1996–1997). She now lives and works in London.

Her more recent images have an almost theatrical character, often depicting women in staged settings, for example with a Coca-Cola in a pub or inside a public lavatory. She describes her work as "explorations of everyday experiences and observations of inner city life from a female perspective."

Publications
Hannah Starkey: Moments in the Modern World - Photographic Works, 1997-2000, Dublin: Irish Museum of Modern Art, 2000. . Exhibition catalogue. With a foreword by Sarah Glennie and a text by Val Williams.
Hannah Starkey: Photographs 1997–2007. Göttingen: Steidl, 2007. Isabella Kullmann; Liz Jobey. .
Hannah Starkey: Twenty Nine Pictures. Coventry: Mead Gallery, 2011. Hannah Starkey; Diarmuid Costello; Sarah Shalgosky; Margaret Iverson. .
Photographs 1997–2017. London: Mack, 2018. . With a biographical essay by Charlotte Cotton and a transcript of conversation between Starkey and Liz Jobey.

Solo exhibitions
1999: Hannah Starkey, Cornerhouse, Manchester
2000: Hannah Starkey: Photographs, Irish Museum of Modern Art, Dublin
2010: Forum für Fotografie, Cologne
2011: Hannah Starkey: Twenty-Nine Pictures, Mead Gallery, Warwick Arts Centre, Coventry. Curated by Diarmuid Costello.
2011: Visual Puzzles: Hannah Starkey, Ormeau Baths Gallery, Belfast
2022/3: Hannah Starkey: In Real Life, The Hepworth Wakefield, Wakefield, UK, 21 October 2022 – 30 April 2023

Awards
2019: Honorary Fellowship of the Royal Photographic Society, Bristol

Collections
Starkey's work is held in the following public collections:
Tate Modern, London: 4 prints (as of August 2020)
Victoria and Albert Museum, London: 3 prints (as of August 2020)
Irish Museum of Modern Art, Dublin: 1 print (as of August 2020)
Castello di Rivoli, Turin: 3 prints (as of August 2020)

References

External links 
Examples of Starkey's work from Saatchi Gallery
"The photography of Hannah Starkey – in pictures" at The Guardian

1971 births
Living people
20th-century British photographers
20th-century women artists from Northern Ireland
20th-century women photographers
21st-century British photographers
21st-century women artists from Northern Ireland
21st-century women photographers
Alumni of Edinburgh Napier University
Alumni of the Royal College of Art
Artists from Belfast
Artists from London
British contemporary artists
Photographers from Northern Ireland
Women photographers from Northern Ireland
Artists from Northern Ireland